Xerosaprinus is a genus of clown beetles in the family Histeridae. There are more than 20 described species in Xerosaprinus.

Species
These 29 species belong to the genus Xerosaprinus:

 Xerosaprinus acilinea (Marseul, 1862)
 Xerosaprinus bispeculatus (Casey, 1916)
 Xerosaprinus chiliensis (Marseul, 1855)
 Xerosaprinus ciliatoides (Fall, 1917)
 Xerosaprinus ciliatus (J. L. LeConte, 1851)
 Xerosaprinus coerulescens (J. L. LeConte, 1851)
 Xerosaprinus desertoides (McGrath & Hatch, 1941)
 Xerosaprinus diptychus (Marseul, 1855)
 Xerosaprinus effusus (Casey, 1916)
 Xerosaprinus fimbriatus (J. L. LeConte, 1851)
 Xerosaprinus fulgidus (J.E.LeConte, 1859)
 Xerosaprinus hidalgo Mazur, 1990
 Xerosaprinus ignotus (Marseul, 1855)
 Xerosaprinus intritus (Casey, 1893)
 Xerosaprinus laciniatus (Casey, 1916)
 Xerosaprinus lubricus (J. L. LeConte, 1851)
 Xerosaprinus martini (Fall, 1917)
 Xerosaprinus neglectus (Marseul, 1855)
 Xerosaprinus orbicularis
 Xerosaprinus orbiculatus (Marseul, 1855)
 Xerosaprinus plenus (J.L.LeConte, 1851)
 Xerosaprinus psyche (Casey, 1916)
 Xerosaprinus scabriceps (Casey, 1916)
 Xerosaprinus testudo (Casey, 1916)
 Xerosaprinus vafer (Marseul, 1855)
 Xerosaprinus vestitus (J. L. LeConte, 1851)
 Xerosaprinus viator (Marseul, 1855)
 Xerosaprinus vitiosus (J. L. LeConte, 1851)
 Xerosaprinus wenzeli Bousquet & Laplante, 2006

References

Further reading

 
 

Histeridae
Articles created by Qbugbot